Luther John Elliss (born March 22, 1973) is a former American college and professional football player who was a defensive tackle in the National Football League (NFL) for ten seasons.  He played college football for the University of Utah, and was recognized as an All-American.  Drafted in the first round of the 1995 NFL Draft, Elliss played professionally for the Detroit Lions and Denver Broncos of the NFL.  He was a two-time Pro Bowler.

Elliss currently coaches college football, serving as the defensive tackle coach for the Utah Utes football team.

Early years
Elliss was born in Mancos, Colorado.  He attended Mancos High School, and played for the Mancos Blue Jays high school football and basketball teams.

College career
Elliss received an athletic scholarship to attend the University of Utah, and played for the Utah Utes football team as a defensive lineman from 1991 to 1994.  He chose Utah since head football coach Ron McBride told him that he could also play on the basketball team under coach Rick Majerus. After one season he decided to play football full-time. He was a first-team All-Western Athletic Conference (WAC) selection in 1992, 1993 and 1994.  As a senior in 1994, he was recognized as a consensus first-team All American, and was named the WAC Defensive Player of the Year.

Professional career
His nickname during his time in Detroit was "Pass Rushing Luther," and earned it with 324 tackles and 27.0 quarterback sacks with the Lions. The Lions released him after appearing in only five games in 2003.

In his ten-season NFL career, he played in 134 regular season games, started 119 of them, and compiled 331 tackles, 29.0 sacks, seven fumble recoveries, four forced fumbles, and four deflected passes.  He was a Pro Bowl selection in 1999 and 2000.

NFL career statistics

Coaching career
Elliss spent two seasons as the team chaplain for the Denver Broncos of the NFL. On February 27, 2017, Elliss was announced as the new defensive line coach for the Idaho Vandals football team under head coach Paul Petrino.  Elliss has been the defensive tackle coach for the Utah Utes Football team under Kyle Whittingham since January 19, 2022.

Personal life
Elliss and his wife, Rebecca, have 12 children – seven of whom are adopted. Three of his sons, Christian, Kaden, and Noah, play (or played) football for Idaho. In 2019, his son Kaden Elliss was drafted by the New Orleans Saints. In the 2021 NFL Draft his son Christian Elliss went undrafted but was later signed as a UDFA by the Minnesota Vikings. Christian was also Sports Illustrated's secret "Prospect X" for the 2021 draft. In 2022, Noah went undrafted and was signed as an UDFA by the Philadelphia Eagles. 

Elliss is a former resident of Oakland Township, Michigan, in suburban Detroit.

References

1973 births
Living people
All-American college football players
American sportspeople of Samoan descent
American football defensive ends
American football defensive tackles
Denver Broncos players
Detroit Lions players
National Conference Pro Bowl players
People from Montezuma County, Colorado
Players of American football from Colorado
Utah Utes football players